Hypertrophomma is a genus of flies in the family Tachinidae.

Species
H. opacum Townsend, 1915

References

Exoristinae
Diptera of North America
Tachinidae genera
Taxa named by Charles Henry Tyler Townsend